Esperanza Escolar Limjap Osmeña (December 18, 1894 – April 4, 1978) was the second wife of Philippine President Sergio Osmeña and is considered the fourth First Lady of the Philippines.

Biography
Esperanza Limjap y Escolar was born in San Miguel, Manila to Mariano Limjap y Nolasco and María Escolar y Carreón.

She married Osmeña in on January 10, 1920 in San Miguel, Manila, two years after the death of Osmeña's first wife, Estefania Chiong Veloso. The couple had three children: Ramón, Rosalina, and Victor.

She became first lady upon the death of Manuel L. Quezon, when her husband succeeded to the presidency of the Philippine government-in-exile in the United States. However, while her husband was president-in-exile, she herself was still in the Philippines and remained there, during the Japanese occupation of the Philippines during World War II. On 30 Oct. 1944, Russell_W._Volckmann's forces rescued Mrs. Osmena and family from Baguio.

She died on April 4, 1978 in at Makati Medical Center in Makati due to heart failure. She was buried at Manila North Cemetery in Santa Cruz, Manila on April 11, 1978.

See also
List of American guerrillas in the Philippines

References

|-

 

|-

1894 births
1978 deaths
Filipino Roman Catholics
Esperanza Osmena
First Ladies and First Gentlemen of the Philippines
People from Cebu
People from Makati
People from San Miguel, Manila
Burials at the Manila North Cemetery
Spouses of presidents of the Philippines